The Nekite River is a river in the Central Coast region of British Columbia, Canada, flowing south to the head of Smith Inlet. Nekite Indian Reserve No. 2 is located at the mouth of the river and is one of the many reserves of the Gwa'sala-'Nakwaxda'xw Nations band government located in the area of Smith Sound, of which Smith Inlet is the uppermost part.

See also
List of British Columbia rivers

References

Rivers of the Central Coast of British Columbia
Range 2 Coast Land District